Juksan Eum clan is one of the Korean clans. Their Bon-gwan is in Anseong, Gyeonggi Province. According to the research held in 2000, the number of Juksan Eum clan’s member was 2260. He entered Goryeo as a ministry of Rites (Lǐbù) with Queen Noguk who was a queen of Gongmin of Goryeo in Yuan dynasty. After that, 陰俊 became Prince of Juksan. ’s descendant founded Juksan Eum clan and made Juksan, Juksan Eum clan’s Bon-gwan.

See also 
 Korean clan names of foreign origin

References

External links 
 

 
Korean clan names of Chinese origin
Eum clans